Kansas City Southern is the parent company of many railroads and railroad related companies. KCS three main subsidiaries are The Kansas City Southern Railway, Kansas City Southern de México, and The Panama Canal Railway Company.  Together, the three railroads serve over 450 cities and towns.

United States

Alabama
Birmingham
Brookwood
Buhl
Gordo
Holt
Reform
Tuscaloosa

Arkansas
Ashdown
Decatur
Fort Smith
Hope
Gillham
Mena
Nashville
Patmos
Siloam Springs
Vandervoort
Waldron

Illinois
Carrollton
Cockrell
East St. Louis
Godfrey
Jacksonville
Jerseyville
Murrayville
Pleasant Hill
Prouty
Roodhouse
Springfield
Wann

Kansas
Kansas City
Pittsburg

Louisiana
Alexandria
Anacoco
Baton Rouge
Bayou Pierre
Benson
Bienville
Blanchard
Bossier
Calhoun
Campti
Cotton Valley
Coushatta
Crew Lake
Delhi
DeQuincy
DeRidder
Gibsland
Gonzales
Gramercy
Hessmer
Hodge
Lake Charles
Latanier
Leesville
Lobdell Jct.
Magenta
Mansfield
Minden
Monrganza
Monroe
Montgomery
New Orleans
New Roads
Norco
Pineville
Port Hudson
Reeserve
Ruston
Shannon
Shoreline
Shreveport
Sibley
Simmesport
Simsboro
Singer
Spring Hill
Tallulah
Winnfield

Mississippi
Aberdeen
Ackerman
Booneville
Brandon
Cedars
Collins
Corinth
Crawford
Dixon
Egypt
Forest
Glen
Gulfport
Hattiesburg
Hickory
Jackson
Lauderdale
Louisville
Marion
McDonald
Meehan
Mendenhall
Meridian
Morton
Okolona
Palmer
Philadelphia
Prairie
Rankin
Redwood
Rienzi
Saltillo
Sebastopol
Sharps
Starkville
Sturgis
Sucarnoochee
Tupelo
Union
Vicksburg
Wahalak
West Point
Wiggins
Yellow Creek

Missouri
Amsterdam
Armstrong
Asbury
Bowling Green
Centralia
Clark
Drexel
Eve
Fulton
Glasgow
Grandview
Higbee
Higginsville
Hume
Independence
Jaudon
Joplin
Kansas City
Laddonia
Marshall
Mexico
Neosho
Noel
Odessa
Slater
Vandalia

Oklahoma
Gans
Heavener
Howe
Page
Poteau
Sallisaw
Spiro
Stilwell
Westville

Tennessee
Counce
Middleton

Texas
Alice
Bloomburg
Beaumont
Cason
Corpus Christi
Dallas
Denton
Eagle Lake
Farmersville
Galveston
Greenville
Hebbronville
Houston
Hoot
Hughes Springs
Hull
Jury
Laredo
Mauriceville
Metro Jct.
Oilton
Placedo
Port Arthur
Renner
Robstown
Ruliff
San Diego
Sinton
Sulphur Springs
Texarkana
Wylie
Zacha

Mexico

Aguascalientes
Aguascalientes
San Gil
Gallardo
Jaltomate
Amapola del Río
San José del Río
Chicalote
El Tule

Coahuila
Agua Nueva
Benjamin Mendez
Encantada
Gómez Farias
Guillermo
La Ventura
Ledezma
Ramos Arizpe
Saltillo

D.F.
El Naranjo
Julia
Los Morales
México City
San Pedro
Santa Fe
Tacuba

Guanajuato
Acámbaro
Alverez
Arena Blanca
Arroyo de la Luna
Buchanan López
Chamcacuaro
Comonfort
Crucero a Cel
Dolores Hidalgo
Escobedo
Montelongo
Ojo Seco
Piedra De Lumbre
Salvatierra
San José Iturbide
San Miguel de Allende

Hidalgo
Aragón
Ciudad Cahagun
General Zarag
Huichapan
Pachuca
Tula

Jalisco
Atequiza
Camcel
Constancia
Corona
El Castillo
El Grande
El Pedregal
Feliciano
Guadalajara
La Barca
La Capilla
La Junta
Ladrillera
Limón
Ocotlan
Poncitlan
Salamea
San Jacinto
Santa Inesita

México State
Aguatepec
Alberto Gardunoc
Atlacomulco
Azteca
Bassoco
Campero
Carretera
Celaya
Chico
Chipiltepec
Chuautlalpan
Corralejo
Cortazar
Cortes
Del Río
Dona Rosa
Dos Ríos
El Oro
Huehuetoca
Irapuato
Ixtlahuaca de Rayón
Joaquín
La Maraña
La Piedad
Manto
Metepec
Oliva
Paula
Penjamo
Polotitlan
Robles
Salamanca
Salazar
San Andrés
San Martín
San Vicente
Santa Clara
Silao
Tepeolilco
Texcoco
Tlalnepantla
Toluca
Tultenango
Vieyra
Villagrán
Xometla

Michoacán
Agua Buena
Ajuno
Caltzontzin
Caracha
Chupanguio
Coro
El Jabalí
El Plan
El Salvador
Fontezuela
Huarenitizo
Huingo
Infiernillo
Irimbo
Jácaro
La Angangueo
La Junta
La Vinata
Las Canas
Lázaro Cárdenas
Limoncito
Los Chivos
Maravatio
Morelia
Ocampo
Parácuaro
Pátzcuaro
Tarascon
Zitácuaro

Nuevo León
Anáhuac 
Arista
Barretosa
Doctor Coss
Jarita
La Mariposa
Lampazos de Naranjo
Leona
Monterrey
Ramon
Ramones
Salinas Victoria
San Nicolás de los Garza
Soledad
Topo
Villaldama

Puebla
Artesiano
Oriental
Pizarro
Tepeyahualco
Titipanapa
Varela

Querétaro
Ahorcado
Cazadero
Chintepec
Hércules
La Griega
Palmillas
Peón
Querétaro
San Juan del Río
Viborillas

San Luis Potosí
Cardenas
Celis
Cerritos
Cerritos
Las tablas
Moctezuma
Rio Verde
Salinas de Hidalgo
San Ignacio
San Luis Potosí
San Viccente
Tambaca
Tolosa
Valles
Vanegas
Venado
Vharcas
Wadley

Tamaulipas
Altimira
Camargo
Canales
Miramar
Nuevo Laredo
Ochoa
Ramirez
Reynosa
Rio Bravo
Sanchez
Sandoval
Tampico
Valadeces

Tlaxcala
Calderón
Ceron
Dolores
Iturbe
La Luz
La Trasquila
Munoz
Pavón
Santo Domingo
Tecoac
Tlaloc
Vega
Veloz
Xicohtncatl

Veracruz
Alborada
Banderilla
Carbono
Cardel
Chavarrillo
Chila
Dehesa
Extremo Vía
Ferronales
Jalapa
La Posta
Mendez
Ochoa
Pacho
Palmar
Rubin
San Miguel
Tamarindo
Tamos
Tigrillos
Veracruz

Zacatecas
Bimbaletes
Genaro
La Honda
La Olma
Loreto
Tauro

Panama

Colón
Colón

Panamá
Panama

References
Overview of KCS Divisions (click on a division to see the cities served).
Map featuring all railroads.
KCS System Map 1
KCS System Map 2

Cities
Kansas City Southern